Chatham Township is one of the seventeen townships of Medina County, Ohio, United States.  The 2020 census found 2,213 people in the township.

Geography
Located in the west part of the county, it borders the following townships:
Litchfield Township - north
York Township - northeast corner
Lafayette Township - east
Westfield Township - southeast corner
Harrisville Township - south
Homer Township - southwest corner
Spencer Township - west
Penfield Township, Lorain County - northwest corner

No municipalities are located in Chatham Township.

Name and history
Chatham Township was founded in 1818. The township was named after Chatham, in England. It is the only Chatham Township statewide.

Government
The township is governed by a three-member board of trustees, who are elected in November of odd-numbered years to a four-year term beginning on the following January 1. Two are elected in the year after the presidential election and one is elected in the year before it. There is also an elected township fiscal officer, who serves a four-year term beginning on April 1 of the year after the election, which is held in November of the year before the presidential election. Vacancies in the fiscal officership or on the board of trustees are filled by the remaining trustees.

References

External links
County website

Townships in Medina County, Ohio
Townships in Ohio